Per Christian Liljegren (born 3 February 1971), is best known as the lead vocalist, and primary lyricist, for the Swedish Christian melodic power metal band, Narnia.

Liljegren is also the frontman of the metal bands Audiovision, Divinefire, Flagship, and Wisdom Call. He is also the owner of the Liljegren Records label which features bands such as Divinefire, Crimson Moonlight, Sanctifica, Grimmark, Harmony, Veni Domine, and Majestic Vanguard. He changed his last name to Rivel by choosing to take his wife's last name when they were married. After the divorce in 2008 he changed his name back to Liljegren.

On 29 April 2008 Christian announced his departure from Narnia. There were no controversy between the band members, Liljegren said he had to give his body rest. And then in 2014 he came back to Narnia.

Liljegren is the lead vocalist of the power metal project Golden Resurrection with ReinXeed's lead guitarist Tommy Johansson (now in Sabaton). Their debut album was released in November 2010.

Lilijegren is brothers with Hubertus Lilijegren, Guitarist and Vocalist for bands such as Crimson Moonlight, Pantokrator, and Sanctifica.

Discography

Venture
 The Wonderous Diamond (1988)

Trinity
 Soldiers Of Freedom (1988)

Borderline
 5 Track Demo Cassette (1989)
 7" Vinyl Single - Fri/Calling (1989)
 3 Track Demo Cassette (1990)
 7" Vinyl Single - I Can't Live Without Your Love/ Let Me Rest In Your Arms (1991)

Modest Attraction
 Modest Attraction (5 Track Demo Cassette) (1991)
 II - (5 Track Demo Cassette) (1992)
 Get Ready (1992)
 Blizzful Zample (1993)
 The Truth In Your Face (1994)
 Modest Christmas (Single) (1994)
 Divine Luxury (1996)

Narnia
 Awakening (1998)
 Long Live the King (1999)
 Desert Land (2001)
 The Great Fall (2003) (Not released in Japan)
 At Short Notice... Live in Germany (2006)
 Enter the Gate (2006)
 Decade of Confession (2007)
 Narnia (2016)
 We Still Believe - Made in Brazil (2018)
 From Darkness to Light (2019)

Wisdom Call
 Wisdom Call (2001)

Beautiful Mind
 Hero (3 Track Demo) (2002)

Divinefire
 Glory Thy Name (2004)
 Hero (2005)
 Into a New Dimension (2006)
 Farewell (2008)
 Eye of the Storm (2011)

Flagship
 Mayden Voyage (2005)

Audiovision
 The Calling (2005)
 Focus (2010)

Golden Resurrection
 Glory to My King (2010)
 "Pray for Japan" (Single) (2011)
 Man with a Mission (2011)
 One Voice for the Kingdom (2013)

The Waymaker
 The Waymaker (2020)

Flames of Fire
 Flames of Fire (2022)

Solo career
 Ett Liv Jag Fått Att Leva (2002)
 Kraft (2015)
 Melodic Passion (2021)

References

External links
 Rivel Records Online
 Christian Liljegren's Biography
 Christian Liljegren's Biography @ Narnia's website
 Christian Liljegren on Myspace

Swedish heavy metal singers
Swedish rock singers
Swedish Christians
Christian metal musicians
Narnia (band) members
Living people
1971 births
21st-century Swedish singers